Aaron Moshe Schechter (also Aharon Moshe Schechter) is an American Haredi rabbi. He is the rosh yeshiva (dean) of Yeshiva Rabbi Chaim Berlin and its post-graduate Talmudical division, Kollel Gur Aryeh. He also serves on the presidium of Agudath Israel of America and is a member of that organization's Moetzes Gedolei HaTorah (Council of Torah Sages).

Early life
Aaron Moshe Schechter was born in Brooklyn in the 1920s. He became a disciple of Yitzchak Hutner after being enrolled in the Yeshiva Rabbi Chaim Berlin as a young child. He also studied in Lakewood Yeshiva.

Disciple of Rav Yitzchak Hutner

Hutner chose Schechter for leadership positions in the yeshiva even prior to Schechter's marriage. Hutner encouraged him to write a rabbinic commentary on Maimonides, which he called Avodas Aharon.

Rosh yeshiva of Yeshiva Rabbi Chaim Berlin
Hutner said that Schechter and Rabbi Yonasan David would serve as co-equal roshei yeshiva of Yeshiva Rabbi Chaim Berlin.

Agudath Israel and Moetzes Gedolei HaTorah
After the death of Hutner in 1980, Schechter joined the nesius (presidium) of Agudath Israel of America. 

Schechter has worked closely with two other early disciples of Hutner on the Moetzes Gedolei HaTorah, Aharon Feldman of Yeshiva Ner Yisrael, and Yaakov Perlow, the Rebbe of Novominsk, who  was appointed  Rosh Agudas Yisroel (head of Agudath Israel of America).

On January 13, 2015, Schechter resigned from the Moetzes Gedolei Hatorah over a dispute regarding internal dissent in the World Agudath Israel-affiliated Degel Hatorah. After the dispute was settled, he returned.

Personal life
Schechter married Shoshana Roisa Leichtung in 1954. She served as the Principal of General Studies at Yeshiva of Brooklyn's girls' elementary school for over 20 years. She died on August 4, 2016. They had two sons. One, Mordechai Zelig Schechter, serves as the mashgiach ruchani (spiritual supervisor) at Yeshiva Rabbi Chaim Berlin. The other, Nosson Schechter, is a mohel. Their son-in-law is Rabbi Shlomo Halioua, current rosh yeshiva of Yeshiva Rabbi Chaim Berlin. Their eldest daughter is Esther Yormark, teacher at Beis Yaakov Academy in Brooklyn.

Works
 Avodas Aharon

See also 
 Daas Torah
 Torah study

External links 
 Rabbi Schechter speaks to students on OU radio, December 28, 2006
 Participates in conference concerning conversions, February 7, 2007
 Endorses the outreach kiruv work of the oorah.org organization
 Member of rabbinical committee, ''Vaad L'Hatzolas Nidchei Yisroel
 Video of Rabbi Schechter speaking about reconciling Science and Torah

References 

20th-century American rabbis
21st-century American rabbis
Living people
American Haredi rabbis
Rosh yeshivas
Moetzes Gedolei HaTorah
Year of birth missing (living people)
Orthodox rabbis from New York City